Woodman Peak is the lowest summit on the southwestern end of the ridge of 7,794-foot Dutch Mountain in Tooele County, Utah. Woodman Peak lies 3 miles northwest of Gold Hill, Utah.

References 

Mountains of Tooele County, Utah